Nordstromia ochrozona is a moth in the family Drepanidae. It was described by Felix Bryk in 1943. It is found in north-eastern Myanmar.

References

Moths described in 1943
Drepaninae